Leopard was a 44-gun fourth-rate frigate of the English Royal Navy, originally built for the navy of the Commonwealth of England at Deptford, and launched in February 1659. By 1666 her armament had been increased to 56 guns.

Leopard was sunk as the foundation for a breakwater in 1699.

Notes

References

Lavery, Brian (2003) The Ship of the Line - Volume 1: The development of the battlefleet 1650-1850. Conway Maritime Press. .
Winfield, Rif (2009) British Warships in the Age of Sail 1603-1714: Design, Construction, Careers and Fates. Seaforth Publishing, .

Ships of the line of the Royal Navy
1650s ships
Ships sunk as breakwaters